Archon apollinaris is a species of butterfly in the family Papilionidae. It is found in Iran, Iraq, Syria, and Turkey.Seitz states-In the
North-East of Asia Minor, Goman Olti (Pontus, at an altitude of about 1500 m), and in Armenia a usually smaller, pale and in both sexes sparsely marked mountain-form of Archon apollinus occurs, which is moreover characterized bya reduced marginal band of the hindwing; this is apollinaris Stgr. (= pallidior Spuler) (10 d); a dwarfed form of the female which is very deeply coloured in contrast to the ordinary form of the female of this subspecies may be called -ab. mardina (Stgr. i. I.), under which name it is already known in collections.

References

Sources
 Gimenez Dixon, M. 1996. Archon apollinaris. 2006 IUCN Red List of Threatened Species.  Downloaded on 31 July 2007.

Papilionidae
Butterflies of Asia
Butterflies described in 1832
Taxa named by Otto Staudinger
Taxonomy articles created by Polbot